Sideridis turbida, the white colon, is a moth of the family Noctuidae, subfamily Hadeninae.
It is found throughout continental Europe, the British Isles and southern Scandinavia.

Technical description and variation

The wingspan is 36–44 mm. Forewing drab grey, suffused brown, except along costa and inner margin, and in an oblique pale fascia-form submarginal area;the pale submarginal fascia externally throw's off pale teeth; a long black streak from base below cell: median vein white, with only a small white spot at end of cell and a minute black point above it: veins whitish with black terminal streaks in the intervals:hindwing dark greyish, fuscous. - ab. suffusa Tutt is a melanic brown form common in Britain, occurring, but rarely, in the Alps; — ochracea Tutt is a brownish ochreous form, also rare, apparently, on the continent.

Biology
The moth flies from May to July, with a second brood in August–September in southern parts of its range.

Larva reddish brown, with scattered black clots: dorsal and subdorsal lines black and fine; venter paler;thoracic plate black with 3 white lines; head brown. The larvae feed on various plants growing in sandy places, including dandelion and plantain.

The English vernacular name refers to the only distinctive marking on the moth, a pair of white dots outward of the center of the forewing resembling a colon or joined into a > shape.

References

External links
Lepiforum.de

Hadeninae
Moths described in 1790
Moths of Europe
Taxa named by Eugenius Johann Christoph Esper